Gladstone Apartments is a historic apartment building in Nashville, Tennessee, U.S.. It was built in 1923 for Morris Fisher, a developer, and it was designed by architect Charles Ferguson. It has been listed on the National Register of Historic Places since June 16, 1983.

References

Residential buildings on the National Register of Historic Places in Tennessee
Neoclassical architecture in Tennessee
Residential buildings completed in 1923
Buildings and structures in Nashville, Tennessee